Sara Gurowitsch (February 17, 1889 – April 24, 1981) was a Russian Empire-born American cellist and composer.

Early life 
Sarah Gurowitsch was born in the Russian Empire, the daughter of Harry and Esther Goldenberg Gurowitsch, and raised in New York. Her brother Frank and her sister Esther were also musicians. She studied in New York at the National Conservatory of Music and with cellists Hans Kronold and Leo Schulz, then went to Germany for further musical studies with Robert Hausmann. In 1906, she won the Felix Mendelssohn Bartholdi Prize in Berlin.

Career 
While in Europe, Gurowitsch played Eugen d'Albert's cello concerto, with the composer himself accompanying her on piano. She made her American debut in 1910, with the New York Symphony Orchestra, under conductor Walter Damrosch. In 1913 she made a recording of the Kol Nidre, and headlined a "Russian Music Carnival" at Carnegie Hall.

In 1914, she toured on the lyceum circuit with baritone Marcus A. Kellerman. In 1916, she played at a concert of Jewish music at Columbia University. She played a concert at Bushwick High School in 1917. "She has a splendid command of her instrument," commented one reviewer in 1919, "gets a beautiful tone, and plays with sureness and soulful interpretation."

Gurowitsch left the professional stage after marriage in 1919, but she occasionally played at Jewish women's events in Bergen County, New Jersey. For example, in 1931 she played at a women's meeting of the YMHA, and in 1939 she performed at a local meeting of the National Council of Jewish Women.

Personal life 
Sarah Gurowitsch married a fellow Russian immigrant, Samuel Benjamin Leight, in 1919. Their sons Lawrence and Donald became musicians; another son, Edward, became an illustrator. Playwright and television producer Warren Leight is Sarah Gurowitsch's grandson. Her husband died in 1970. Sarah Gurowitsch Leight died in 1981, aged 92 years.

References

External links 
 Esquisses Hébraïques : Clarinet quintets on Jewish themes (1999), includes a recording of Sarah Gurowitsch's "Kol nidrei" for clarinet and string quartet.

1889 births
1981 deaths
American classical cellists
American women classical cellists
Emigrants from the Russian Empire to the United States
National Conservatory of Music of America alumni
20th-century American musicians
20th-century American women musicians
20th-century classical musicians
20th-century cellists